The Hangzhou–Fuzhou–Shenzhen railway (formerly  or ) refers to the dual-track, electrified, high-speed rail lines (HSR) in service along the southeastern coast of China, linking the Yangtze River Delta on the East China Sea and Pearl River Delta on the South China Sea.  It is one of the eight arterial high-speed rail corridors of the national 4+4 high-speed rail grid. The southeast coast is the only region of high-speed rail construction where no previous conventional railroads existed.  Hence, the high-speed rail lines built on the southeast coast will, for the most part, carry both passenger and freight traffic, and will not be passenger-dedicated lines that comprise most of the other HSR corridors in China.

An additional bridge will be built across Hangzhou Bay for high-speed rail, providing a direct link between Shanghai and Ningbo before 2020. Major cities along the route include Hangzhou, Ningbo, Taizhou and Wenzhou in Zhejiang; Fuzhou, Quanzhou, Xiamen and Zhangzhou in Fujian; and Chaozhou, Shantou, Shanwei, Huizhou and Shenzhen in Guangdong. The line was folded into the Coastal corridor as part of the reorganization into the national 8+8 high-speed rail grid.

Constituent lines
All lines are now in operation.

Station list

See also
 High-speed rail in China

References

High-speed railway lines in China
High-speed rail in China
Rail transport in Shanghai
Rail transport in Zhejiang
Rail transport in Fujian
Rail transport in Guangdong